Hungary–Ukraine relations refers to the bilateral relations between Hungary and Ukraine. The modern bilateral relationship between Hungary and Ukraine formally began in the early 1990s, after the end of communism in Hungary in 1989 and Ukrainian independence from the Soviet Union in 1991. Since then, the relationship has been marred by controversy over the rights of the Hungarian minority in the western Ukrainian region of Zakarpattia, where 150,000 ethnic Hungarians reside. Hungary and Ukraine have embassies in Kyiv and Budapest, respectively, as well as consulates in regions with large minority populations.

History of relations

Hungarian conquest of the Carpathian Basin

As told by the Primary Chronicle, the first interactions between the Hungarians and Kievan Rus' occurred towards the end of the 9th century during the Hungarian conquest of the Carpathian Basin, at Askold's Grave in Kyiv. During the Hungarian migration from the Ural Mountains to the Pannonian Basin, the Hungarians crossed the Dnieper river near Kyiv, the capital of Kievan Rus'. There, they stayed at the site of Askold's grave, eventually passing peacefully through the city. During the Middle Ages, the location of Askold's Grave became known in Ukrainian as Uhors'ke urochyshche, in memory of the Hungarian passage through the area, and retains that name today.

In 895, the Hungarians entered the Pannonian Basin through the Verecke Pass in the Carpathian Mountains (today in Ukraine), where they went on to establish the Kingdom of Hungary. In 1996, the Hungarian government received permission from Ukraine to install a monument commemorating the 1100th anniversary of the passing of the Hungarians through the Verecke Pass and the Hungarian conquest of the Carpathian Basin. Completed in 2008 by Hungarian sculptor Péter Matl, the structure sits on the border of Lviv and Zakarpattia oblasts near the village of Klymets.
 
During the Hungarian invasions of Europe of the 10th century, the Hungarians and Kievan Rus' at various times found themselves allied with one another. In 943, Rus' forces provided support for a Hungarian offensive against the Byzantine Empire, which culminated in the purchasing of peace by Byzantine Emperor Romanos I Lekapenos. During the final Hungarian invasion of Europe, in 970, Grand Prince of Kiev Sviatoslav I attacked the Byzantine Empire with supporting Hungarian auxiliary troops, eventually facing defeat at the Battle of Arcadiopolis and effectively concluding the Hungarian invasions of Europe.

Carpatho-Ukraine

In 1939, in the aftermath of the breakup of the Second Czechoslovak Republic, the formerly autonomous Carpatho-Ukraine declared independence on March 15. The same day, the Kingdom of Hungary occupied and annexed the territory. Over the course of a few days, the 40,000 strong Hungarian army overpowered the limited forces of the newly proclaimed unrecognized state, which had only 2,000 troops. By the 18th, Hungarian forces took full control of the territory of Carpatho-Ukraine.

In the chaos that followed, an estimated 27,000 Ukrainian civilians were killed. Approximately 75,000 Ukrainians from the area sought asylum in the Soviet Union, of whom 60,000 ultimately died in Soviet Gulags.

Modern Relations
The modern bilateral relationship between Hungary and Ukraine began in the early 1990s, after the end of communism in Hungary in 1989 and Ukrainian independence from the Soviet Union in 1991. As recently as 2016, relations between the two nations remained largely positive.

2017 language law

In September 2017, then-president of Ukraine Petro Poroshenko signed the 2017 Ukrainian Education Law, which had previously been adopted by the Ukrainian parliament. The new law made Ukrainian the required language of study for all state schools in Ukraine past the fifth grade, reversing a 2012 law signed by ousted former Ukrainian president Viktor Yanukovych that allowed regions with an ethnic minority making up more than ten percent of the population to use minority languages in education. Although mainly intended to discourage the use of Russian in public education, the policy meant that schools in Hungarian majority areas of Zakarpattia, including many funded directly by the Hungarian government, would be forced to stop teaching in the Hungarian language.

The change in rules served as the catalyst for the rapid deterioration of relations between Hungary and Ukraine. Immediately after the adoption of the law, Hungarian Minister of Foreign Affairs Péter Szijjártó announced that Hungary would block all further integration of Ukraine into NATO and the European Union and offered to "guarantee that all this will be painful for Ukraine in future." This marked a significant shift in Hungarian foreign policy towards Ukraine, as it had previously supported stronger Ukrainian integration into NATO and the European Union and advocated for visa-free travel between Ukraine and the European Union, largely in order to make travel to Hungary easier for the Hungarian minority in Ukraine.

Following through on its promises, in October 2017, Hungary vetoed and effectively blocked the convening of a NATO-Ukraine commission meeting. In response, Ukrainian officials announced concessions to some Hungarian demands, most notably extending the transition period until the implementation of the language law to 2023.

Berehove Military Base
In March 2018, the Ukrainian government announced a plan to restore a military base in the ethnic Hungarian-majority border town of Berehove, situated ten kilometers from the Hungarian border. The plan called for the permanent placement of 800 Ukrainian troops from the 10th Mountain Assault Brigade and the 128th Mountain Assault Brigade at the base.

Ukrainian officials faced immediate backlash from the Hungarian government after the announcement. Hungarian Minister of Foreign Affairs Péter Szijjártó restated that Hungary would block any further Ukrainian integration into NATO or the European Union until Hungarian concerns were addressed, and called the placement of the base in a mostly ethnic Hungarian area "disgusting."

The plans for the base were ultimately abandoned; however, in May 2020, officials again announced plans for the restoration of the same military base and the permanent stationing of Ukrainian troops there, this time from the 80th Air Assault Brigade.

Hungarian passport distribution
In September 2018, an undercover video that showed diplomats in the Hungarian consulate in Berehove granting Hungarian citizenship and distributing Hungarian passports to Ukrainian citizens sparked new tensions between the two nations. The video, published by Ukrinform, captured recipients of new passports reciting an oath of allegiance to Hungary and singing the Hungarian national anthem. Because voluntarily obtaining a foreign citizenship while failing to renounce Ukrainian citizenship is illegal according to Ukrainian nationality law, Hungarian diplomats instructed new citizens to hide their possession of Hungarian passports from Ukrainian authorities.

In response to the incident, the Foreign Ministry of Ukraine declared the local Hungarian consul in Berehove persona non grata, expelling him from Ukrainian territory and accusing him of violating the Vienna Convention on Consular Relations. In turn, Hungary announced the expulsion of a Ukrainian consul in Budapest and reiterated threats to block Ukraine's further accession to NATO and the European Union.

2019 Ukrainian parliamentary election

In the run-up to the 2019 Ukrainian parliamentary election, Hungarian officials attempted on numerous occasions to influence the results in favor of candidates backed by the Party of Hungarians of Ukraine, a political party active in Zakarpattia Oblast. Specifically, the Hungarian government worked to sway voters in favor of party leader Vasyl Brenzovych and two other candidates contesting seats in the Verkhovna Rada, Ukraine's parliament. The party received direct payments in the form of Hungarian grant money, and the Hungarian Development Bank spent 800,000 Hungarian forints (about 2,400 Euros at the time) paying for billboards supporting the organization in violation of Ukrainian law.

Throughout July 2019, a number of top Hungarian figures visited Zakarpattia in order to hold rallies and lobby voters for the party's candidates, including Minister of Foreign Affairs Péter Szijjártó. Around the same time, party leader and parliamentary candidate Vasyl Brenzovych visited Budapest to attend a meeting with Prime Minister of Hungary Viktor Orbán. Despite the extensive efforts, none of the Party of Hungarians of Ukraine's candidates were ultimately elected.
 
In response to the meddling, the Ukrainian government accused Hungary of violating the Charter of the United Nations and Vienna Convention on Diplomatic Relations.

Gazprom natural gas deal

On September 27, 2021, the Hungarian government signed a 15-year natural gas contract with Gazprom, Russia's state-owned energy conglomorate. The deal will provide 4.5 billion cubic meters of Russian gas to Hungary annually through the newly constructed TurkStream pipeline; under the contract, 3.5 billion cubic meters will be transported through Serbia and 1 billion cubic meters will go through Austria, making up about half of Hungary's natural gas consumption. By bypassing Ukraine entirely, the new route strips Ukraine of millions of dollars in profits from transit fees on Russian natural gas shipments to central and western Europe, on which it is economically reliant.

The agreement sparked new tensions between Hungary and Ukraine. Shortly after the contract was signed, the Ukrainian Ministry of Foreign Affairs issued a statement deriding the deal as politically motivated and economically unreasonable, meant solely to please the Kremlin, and intended to harm the national interests of Ukraine and Hungary–Ukraine relations. The statement also accused Hungary of violating the Treaty on Good Neighborliness and Cooperation between Ukraine and Hungary of December 6, 1991, suspended the Joint Ukrainian-Hungarian Intergovernmental Commission on Economic Cooperation, and called for a European Commission investigation into the deal's compliance with European energy law.

In response, Hungarian Minister of Foreign Affairs Péter Szijjártó summoned the Ukrainian ambassador to Hungary, calling Ukraine's actions a "violation of our sovereignty" and accusing Ukraine of trying to halt the deal and prevent "a secure gas supply for Hungary". In turn, Ukraine's Ministry of Foreign Affairs summoned Hungary's ambassador to Ukraine in a tit for tat move, reiterated its position that the agreement undermines Ukraine's national security and the energy security of Europe, and said that it would take "decisive measures" to protect its interests.

In December 2021, the Hungarian government reversed course, signing an agreement to transport up to 2.9 billion cubic meters of natural gas through Ukraine annually on top of the Gazprom deal. Alongside a larger deal with Slovakia, the new contract will increase Ukraine's guaranteed natural gas exports by nearly 30%. On December 28, after the deal's signing, the foreign ministers of both nations declared their "mutual intention to improve bilateral relations" between Hungary and Ukraine.

2022 Russian invasion of Ukraine 

Days after the beginning of the 2022 Russian invasion of Ukraine, Hungarian president János Áder and prime minister Viktor Orbán condemned the invasion, and declared their support for Ukraine in the conflict. Áder added that the conflict was "not provoked by Kyiv”, and said that Hungary “hold[s] the leaders of the Russian Federation responsible for the bloodshed", while Orbán noted that military support "out of the question, though we will, of course, provide humanitarian aid".

However, in the leadup to the 2022 Hungarian parliamentary election, Orbán avoided directly criticizing Russian president Vladimir Putin, and expressed opposition to potential blockades of Russian oil and gas, on which Hungary relies. During his victory speech on April 3, Orbán said that Ukrainian president Volodymyr Zelenskyy was one of the "opponents" that he had overcome in order to win the parliamentary elections. On April 6, Hungary signaled its intent to agree to pay for Russian gas in rubles, breaking ranks with the rest of the European Union.

In early May, Hungary said that it would veto a proposed European Union sanctions package against the Russian energy sector. Explaining his country's opposition to the sanctions, Hungarian Minister of Foreign Affairs Péter Szijjártó said that "Hungary’s energy supply cannot be endangered because no one can expect us to allow the price of the war (in Ukraine) to be paid by Hungarians".

On May 1, Oleksiy Danilov, the secretary of the National Security and Defense Council of Ukraine, accused Hungary of having advance knowledge of the 2022 Russian invasion of Ukraine, saying that Vladimir Putin had warned the Hungarian government ahead of time, and that Hungary had plans to annex parts of Zakarpattia Oblast in Western Ukraine, which lies on the border with Hungary. Hungarian officials condemned Danilov's accusation as false, and expressed "outrage" over his claims.

Hungary has accepted many refugees from Ukraine, some of them travel to other EU countries.

Diplomatic missions
Due to their significant minority populations within each other's borders, Hungary and Ukraine each maintain an extensive network of diplomatic missions across both nations. Hungary has an embassy in Kyiv, a consulate-general in Uzhhorod, and a consulate in Berehove, while Ukraine maintains an embassy in Budapest and a consulate-general in Nyíregyháza.

Border

Hungary and Ukraine share a  border, roughly following the Tisza river across the Zakarpattia Lowland. The border has a single point of entry by passenger rail, between Chop and Záhony, and one point of entry that only serves freight rail, between Solovka and Eperjeske.

A number of Ukrainian highways and Hungarian roads meet at the border, including Ukraine's M06, which turns into Hungary's Main Road 4 in Solomonovo, and the M26, which continues as Route 491 in Hungary. Both route systems are part of the international E-road network, as the E573 and E58, respectively. Only five official points of entry for vehicles exist along the border.

Because Hungary is a member of the European Union while Ukraine is not, the boundary is an external border of the European Union. Since the approval of visa-free travel between Ukraine and the European Union in 2017, the border can be crossed in either direction without a travel visa.

Twin towns and sister cities

Because of the Hungarian minority there, the vast majority of Hungary and Ukraine's city links involve towns and villages in Zakarpattia Oblast; specifically, many twinned Ukrainian towns are on or near the border with Hungary and have Hungarian-majority populations. Conversely, multiple agreements between the two nation's municipalities involve towns and villages in Hungary's Szabolcs-Szatmár-Bereg County, which is home to a significant part of the Ukrainian minority in Hungary.

 Baktalórántháza, Szabolcs-Szatmár-Bereg County –  Tiachiv, Zakarpattia Oblast
 Balmazújváros, Hajdú-Bihar County –  Tiachiv, Zakarpattia Oblast
 Békéscsaba, Békés County –  Uzhhorod, Zakarpattia Oblast
 Biatorbágy, Pest County –  Velyka Dobron, Zakarpattia Oblast
 Bicske, Fejér County –  Chop, Zakarpattia Oblast
 Budakeszi, Pest County –  Dyida, Zakarpattia Oblast
 Budapest –  Berehove, Zakarpattia Oblast
 Belváros-Lipótváros, Budapest –  Rakhiv, Zakarpattia Oblast
 Budafok-Tétény, Budapest –  Koson, Zakarpattia Oblast
 Celldömölk, Vas County –  Mukachevo, Zakarpattia Oblast
 Dabas, Pest County –  Mukachevo, Zakarpattia Oblast
 Deszk, Csongrád-Csanád County –  Rakhiv, Zakarpattia Oblast
 Diósd, Pest County –  Velyki Heivtsi, Zakarpattia Oblast
 Dunaújváros, Fejér County –  Alchevsk, Luhansk Oblast
 Eger, Heves County –  Mukachevo, Zakarpattia Oblast and  Vynohradiv, Zakarpattia Oblast
 Felsőzsolca, Borsod-Abaúj-Zemplén County –  Vyshkovo, Zakarpattia Oblast
 Ferencváros, Budapest –  Berehove, Zakarpattia Oblast
 Göd, Pest County –  Yanoshi, Zakarpattia Oblast
 Hajdúböszörmény, Hajdú-Bihar County –  Berehove, Zakarpattia Oblast
 Hatvan, Heves County –  Berehove, Zakarpattia Oblast
 Hódmezővásárhely, Csongrád-Csanád County –  Solotvyno, Zakarpattia Oblast
 Inárcs, Pest County –  Bene, Zakarpattia Oblast
 Jászberény, Jász-Nagykun-Szolnok County –  Tiachiv, Zakarpattia Oblast
 Jászfényszaru, Jász-Nagykun-Szolnok County –  Hat, Zakarpattia Oblast
 Kecskemét, Bács-Kiskun County –  Berehove, Zakarpattia Oblast and  Simferopol, Autonomous Republic of Crimea
 Kistarcsa, Pest County –  Fanchykovo, Zakarpattia Oblast
 Kisújszállás, Jász-Nagykun-Szolnok County –  Serne, Zakarpattia Oblast
 Kisvárda, Szabolcs-Szatmár-Bereg County –  Mukachevo, Zakarpattia Oblast
 Komárom, Komárom-Esztergom County –  Khust, Zakarpattia Oblast
 Körmend, Vas County –  Yuzhne, Odessa Oblast
 Kunszentmiklós, Bács-Kiskun County –  Chepa, Zakarpattia Oblast
 Maglód, Pest County –  Bene, Zakarpattia Oblast
 Mátészalka, Szabolcs-Szatmár-Bereg County –  Mukachevo, Zakarpattia Oblast
 Mosonmagyaróvár, Győr-Moson-Sopron County –  Berehove, Zakarpattia Oblast
 Nagykálló, Szabolcs-Szatmár-Bereg County –  Tiachiv, Zakarpattia Oblast
 Nyírbátor, Szabolcs-Szatmár-Bereg County –  Khust, Zakarpattia Oblast and  Vynohradiv, Zakarpattia Oblast
 Nyíregyháza, Szabolcs-Szatmár-Bereg County –  Uzhhorod, Zakarpattia Oblast
 Paks, Tolna County –  Vyshkovo, Zakarpattia Oblast
 Pápa, Veszprém County –  Vyshkovo, Zakarpattia Oblast
 Pesterzsébet, Budapest –  Alushta, Autonomous Republic of Crimea
 Pestszentlőrinc-Pestszentimre, Budapest –  Tiachiv, Zakarpattia Oblast
 Ráckeve, Pest County –  Shom, Zakarpattia Oblast
 Szeged, Csongrád-Csanád County –  Odessa, Odessa Oblast and  Rakhiv, Zakarpattia Oblast
 Székesfehérvár, Fejér County –  Luhansk, Luhansk Oblast
 Szirmabesenyő, Borsod-Abaúj-Zemplén County –  Khust, Zakarpattia Oblast
 Szombathely, Vas County –  Uzhhorod, Zakarpattia Oblast
 Tamási, Tolna County –  Pyiterfolvo, Zakarpattia Oblast
 Tatabánya, Komárom-Esztergom County –  Pyiterfolvo, Zakarpattia Oblast
 Téglás, Hajdú-Bihar County –  Tyihlash, Zakarpattia Oblast
 Tiszaújváros, Borsod-Abaúj-Zemplén County –  Berehove, Zakarpattia Oblast
 Törökszentmiklós, Jász-Nagykun-Szolnok County –  Nevetlenfolu, Zakarpattia Oblast
 Túrkeve, Jász-Nagykun-Szolnok County –  Rakhiv, Zakarpattia Oblast and  Velykyi Bychkiv, Zakarpattia Oblast
 Újbuda, Budapest –  Bene, Zakarpattia Oblast and  Berehove Raion, Zakarpattia Oblast
 Újfehértó, Szabolcs-Szatmár-Bereg County –  Hut, Zakarpattia Oblast
 Vác, Pest County –  Tiachiv, Zakarpattia Oblast
 Várkerület, Budapest –  Mukachevo, Zakarpattia Oblast
 Vásárosnamény, Szabolcs-Szatmár-Bereg County –  Berehove, Zakarpattia Oblast
 Záhony, Szabolcs-Szatmár-Bereg County –  Chop, Zakarpattia Oblast
 Zalaegerszeg, Zala County –  Berehove, Zakarpattia Oblast and Kherson, Kherson Oblast
 Zirc, Veszprém County –  Dertsen, Zakarpattia Oblast

See also
Foreign relations of Hungary
Foreign relations of Ukraine
Hungarians in Ukraine
Ukrainians in Hungary
Hungary–Ukraine border
Ukraine–European Union relations
Accession of Ukraine to the European Union

References

 
Ukraine
Bilateral relations of Ukraine